Salajka, also known as Slavija, is an urban neighborhood of the city of Novi Sad, Serbia.

Borders

The western and southern border of Salajka is Kisačka ulica (Kisač Street), the eastern border is Temerinska ulica (Temerin Street), and the northern border is Danube-Tisa-Danube channel.

Neighbouring city quarters
The neighbouring city quarters are: Podbara in the east, Stari Grad in the south, Rotkvarija in the south-west, Banatić, Pervazovo Naselje and Industrijska Zona Jug in the west, and Vidovdansko Naselje  in the north, across the channel.

History
Between 1980 and 1989, the seat of the Slavija municipality, one of the former seven municipalities of Novi Sad City, was located in Salajka.

Sport
The play ground of the football club "Slavija" is located in Salajka.

Gallery

See also
 Neighborhoods of Novi Sad

References

Jovan Mirosavljević, Brevijar ulica Novog Sada 1745-2001, Novi Sad, 2002.
Zoran Rapajić, Novi Sad bez tajni, Beograd, 2002.
Milorad Grujić, Vodič kroz Novi Sad i okolinu, Novi Sad, 2004.

External links 

 Detailed map of Novi Sad and Salajka

Novi Sad neighborhoods